Barricada (1979–1998) was an official publication of FSLN during the Sandinista revolutionary period.  The first issue was published on 26 July 1979 and its stated goal was to promote the revolutionary project of the revolutionary regime. In the early days "Barricada" was a competitor with "El Nuevo Diario" and La Prensa.

The first international editor of the paper was Sofía Montenegro, who had a tempestuous relationship with the paper, leaving after a breakdown, returning, being fired for criticizing the Party and finally being asked to return as editor of the editorial page in 1984. Motivated by the riots against the Sandinista government and fake news, a group of young communicators took the task of bring to life to a new informative portal named "Barricada", retaking the same name of the first official journal by the Sandinista Marxist Revolution at the end of the 70s. The new Barricada's news portal is at https://web.archive.org/web/20121104104220/http://barricada.com.ni/

References

Newspapers published in Nicaragua
Spanish-language newspapers
Sandinista National Liberation Front
Defunct newspapers published in Nicaragua
Nicaraguan Revolution